Cercosaura oshaughnessyi, known commonly as the white-striped eyed lizard, is a species of lizard in the family Gymnophthalmidae. The species is endemic to northern South America.

Etymology
The specific name, oshaughnessyi, is in honor of Arthur O'Shaughnessy, who was a British herpetologist and poet.

Geographic range
C. oshaughnessyi is found in Brazil (Acre, Amapá, western Amazonas), Colombia, Ecuador, French Guiana, and northern Peru.

Reproduction
C. oshaughnessyi is oviparous.

References

Further reading
Boulenger GA (1885). Catalogue of the Lizards in the British Museum (Natural History). Second Edition. Volume II. ... Teiidæ ... London: Trustees of the British Museum (Natural History). Taylor and Francis, printers). xiii + 497 pp. + Plates I-XXIV. (Prionodactylus oshaughnessyi, new species, p. 392 + Plate XXI, figures 1, 1a, 1b, 1c, 1d).
Cunha OR (1961). "Lacertílios da Amazônia. II. Os lagartos da Amazônia brasileira, com especial referenda aos representados na coleção do Museu Goeldi ". Boletim do Museu Paraense Emílio Goeldi, Zoologia 39: 1–189. (Euspondylus oshaughnessyi, new combination, p. 146). (in Portuguese).
Torres-Carvajal, Omar; Lobos, Simón E.; Venegas, Pablo J. (2015). "Phylogeny of Neotropical Cercosaura (Squamata: Gymnophthalmidae) lizards" Molecular Phylogenetics and Evolution 93: 281–288. (Cercosaura oshaughnessyi, new combination).

Cercosaura
Reptiles described in 1885
Taxa named by George Albert Boulenger